19th Group may refer to:

 19th Air Refueling Group, a unit of the United States Air Force
 19th Special Forces Group, a unit of the United States Army

See also
 19th Corps (disambiguation)
 19th Division (disambiguation)
 19th Brigade (disambiguation)
 19th Regiment (disambiguation)
 19th Battalion (disambiguation)
 19th Squadron (disambiguation)